D-Day is the second Japanese extended play of South Korean artist, Daesung, also known by his Japanese stage name, D-Lite, member of boy band Big Bang. The album was released digitally on March 28 and physically on April 12, 2017.

Background and composition
In December 2016, Daesung's first Dome Tour was announced, with shows in the Japanese cities of Saitama and Osaka. In support of this tour, a new album's name and release date was announced in February of the following year. D-Day contains seven songs written and composed by top Japanese artists, including Ayaka, Hata Motohiro and Mizuno Yoshiki. Kameda Seiji, who previously produced his Japanese covers album, D'scover, will be the album's main producer. Daesung wrote some songs himself as well, including "Spring Breeze Melody."

Compared to his previous album, Daesung stated that D-Day is more upbeat and energetic, and that he recorded with "the spirit of a 20-year-old." The track "Venus" is a funk song with a "groovy rhythm" reminiscent of his previous song "Joyful". In contrast, "Anymore" is a "heartrending ballad with emotional vocals" and rock elements.

Promotion
To promote the album, Daesung gave an interview to the radio station Tokyo FM and appeared in several Japanese TV shows, including Sakigake, AbemaTV, and Music On! TV. He also covered the magazine An an and landed editorials on Numéro Tokyo, ViVi and TV Life.

On March 13, a teaser of the title track's music video was posted on Big Bang's official YouTube channel. Jiji Press released an exclusive behind the scenes video of "D-Day" the following day. YGEX then posted daily previews of the other tracks on their website.

D-Day was Daesung's first album to be released for digital download in South Korea.

Commercial performance
After its digital release, D-Day debuted at number-two on Oricon's Digital Weekly Album Chart with 3,462 copies sold. A week later, the physical edition debuted at number one on Oricon's Daily Album Chart with 29,038 copies sold. D-Day debuted at number one at the Oricon Albums Chart weekly, with over 38,000 copies sold, making Daesung the second foreign male solo artist to have two consecutive number one albums in Japan after Michael Jackson. Additionally, it was the best selling album by a Korean soloist in the first half of 2017 in Japan.

Track listing

Charts

Sales

Release history

References

External links

oo

2017 EPs
Avex Group EPs
YG Entertainment EPs
Daesung EPs
Albums produced by Seiji Kameda